Need It may refer to:

 "Need It", song by Kaytranada from Bubba, 2019
 "Need It" (Migos song), 2020